Starzan: Shouting Star of the Jungle, also known as simply Starzan, is a 1989 Filipino comedy film directed by Tony Y. Reyes, written by Reyes and Joey de Leon, and starring de Leon as the titular character. It also stars Zsa Zsa Padilla, Panchito Alba, Tina Paner, Cris Villanueva, Cynthia Patag, and Rene Requiestas. The film is a parody of the Edgar Rice Burroughs character Tarzan.

Produced by Regal Films, it was released on January 4, 1989, and was a box office hit, earning ₱24 million in Metro Manila alone. It became the highest-grossing comedy film in the region at the time, surpassing Batang Quiapo (1986). Critic Lav Diaz gave the film a mixed review, recognizing de Leon and Requiestas as a good comedic duo and commending the film's depiction of the environment's unjust treatment, though he expressed concern about the potentially lowering standards of audiences for films.

The success of Starzan effectively launched a franchise. This includes two sequels, Starzan 2: The Coming of Star Son (1989) and Starzan III: The Jungle Triangle (1990), a spin-off film, Cheeta-eh, Ganda Lalake? (1991), a television series, and an album.

Cast
 Joey de Leon as Starzan
 Zsa Zsa Padilla as Jane
 Panchito Alba as McDoogan
 Tina Paner as Marie
 Cris Villanueva as Anton
 Cynthia Patag as Dooday
 Rene Requiestas as Cheetaeh, Starzan's sidekick
 Rommel Valdez as Ruto
 Spanky Rigor as Indiana Jones
 Don Pepot as Patsangga
 Bomber Moran as Chief Raprap
 Joaquin Fajardo as Chief Bullook
 Vangie Labalan
 Pong Pong
 Larry Silva as a pirate
 Cris Aguilar
 Danny Rojo
 Danny Labra
 Manny Doria
 Rey Solo
 Ernie Forte
 Ding Salvador
 Nemie Gutierrez
 Noel Ong as Ungga, a chimpanzee
 Gerald Granada

Soundtrack
The film's theme song was included in the compilation album Starzan, Cheeta-eh! At Iba Pa Ganda Tugtog.

Release
Starzan was released by Regal Films on January 4, 1989.

Box office
The film was a box office success, earning ₱24 million in Metro Manila alone. Thus, the film became the highest-grossing comedy film in the region at the time, surpassing Pablo Santiago's Batang Quiapo from three years prior. Executive producer Lily Monteverde gave Joey de Leon a ₱1 million bonus as a result of the film's success.

Critical response
Lav Diaz, writing for the Manila Standard, gave Starzan a mixed review, stating that though de Leon and Requiestas are a good comedic combination, they need better, "fragrant material". Diaz gave his concern that audiences might only settle for enjoying "kabantutan" or lowbrow fare such as the film, citing its inclusion of the yell "Cheetaeh!", the last two syllables of which meaning "poop". However, he commended Starzans clear depiction of society's disrespectful treatment of the environment, and suggested that the film could be used by the Haribon Foundation in their advocacy.

See also
 Cheeta-eh, Ganda Lalake?, a 1991 spin-off

Home media
Starzan was released on DVD by Regal Entertainment on July 26, 2013.

References

External links
 

1989 films
1989 comedy films
Filipino-language films
Films set in jungles
Films shot in Rizal
Philippine comedy films
Philippine parody films
Regal Entertainment films
Films directed by Tony Y. Reyes